Ernest Jones (born November 22, 1999) is an American football linebacker for the Los Angeles Rams of the National Football League (NFL). He played college football at South Carolina.

Early life and high school
Jones grew up in Waycross, Georgia and attended Ware County High School. As a senior, he recorded 112 tackles with six tackles for loss, two sacks and three forced fumbles and was named first-team Class AAAAA. Jones committed to play at South Carolina after considering offers from Georgia Tech and Duke.

College career
Jones played in five games as a freshman with 16 tackles and a forced fumble. He became a starter and led South Carolina with 97 tackles in his sophomore season. Going into his junior season, Jones missed most of South Carolina's preseason training due to an appendectomy. He led the team again as a junior with 86 tackles, five of which were for a loss. At the end of the season, Jones declared that he would forgo his senior season and enter the NFL draft.

Professional career

Jones was selected in the third round with the 103rd overall pick of the 2021 NFL Draft by the Los Angeles Rams. Jones signed his four-year rookie contract with the Rams on July 22, 2021.

Jones entered his rookie season in 2021 as a backup inside linebacker behind Kenny Young and Troy Reeder. He was inserted into the starting lineup after the Rams traded Young prior to Week 8. In Week 14, Jones intercepted a pass from Kyler Murray in a 30-23 win over the Arizona Cardinals. He suffered a high ankle sprain in Week 16 and was placed on injured reserve on December 28, finishing the regular season with 61 tackles and one sack, with four passes defensed and two interceptions through 15 games and seven starts. Jones was activated on January 29, 2022 for the NFC Championship game, contributing two tackles as he backed up Reeder in L.A.'s 20-17 triumph over the San Francisco 49ers. In Super Bowl LVI, Jones got the start at inside linebacker and recorded seven tackles with one sack and a pass defensed in the Rams' 23-20 victory against the Cincinnati Bengals.

During the team's voluntary minicamp in May 2022, the team announced that Jones was changing his jersey number from '50' to '53.'

References

External links
South Carolina Gamecocks bio

1999 births
Living people
American football linebackers
South Carolina Gamecocks football players
Los Angeles Rams players
People from Waycross, Georgia
Players of American football from Georgia (U.S. state)